The expressive therapies continuum (ETC) is a model of creative functioning used in the field of art therapy that is applicable to creative processes both within and outside of an expressive therapeutic setting. The concept was initially proposed and published in 1978 by art therapists Sandra Kagin and Vija Lusebrink, who based the continuum on existing models of human development and information processing.

This schematic model serves to describe and assess an individual's level of creative functioning based on aspects such as the artist's purpose for creating a piece, choice of medium, interaction with the chosen medium, and imagery within the piece. Conversely, it also serves to meet the needs of the client by assisting the art therapist in choosing a developmentally or situationally appropriate activity or art medium. By analyzing an individual's art making process and the resulting artwork using the ETC, art therapists can assess strengths, weaknesses, and disconnect in various levels of a client's cognitive functioning - suggesting or substantiating diagnosis of, or recovery from, a mental health condition.

Levels of functioning

According to Lusebrink:

The first three levels of the ETC reflect three established systems of human information processing: the Kinesthetic/Sensory (K/S level); the Perceptual/Affective (P/A level); and the Cognitive/Symbolic (C/S level) ... The fourth level of the ETC is the Creative level (CR). It is seen as a synthesis of the other three levels of the continuum.A diagram of the ETC, as pictured in the top right of the page, can be read from left to right and from the bottom, upwards. The model flows in a direction that travels from simple information processing and image formation to increasingly complex thought processes and interactions with the media. Individuals can fluctuate from level to level depending on personal and situational factors. They may also display an integration of all of the first three levels of functioning. This integration indicates that the individual is operating on the fourth and final level of functioning, known as the Creative level. The Creative level both transcends and intersects the prior three levels, in which the individual is either equally incorporating all aspects of the ETC or is able to find a satisfying and meaningful creative experience on one of the three levels alone.

However, an individual cannot wholly operate at both ends of a level, as each level is bipolar. For example, if the individual is more focused on the quick and scribbly movement of a chalk-pastel on paper, then he or she is less focused on the sensory aspects of the media, such as the sound of the chalk against the paper or the powdery feel of chalk in one's hand.

Kinesthetic/Sensory Level (K/S)

As the first level of the ETC, the Kinesthetic/Sensory level is described as a form of preverbal information processing that is "rhythmic, tactile, and sensual". This simple type of interaction with various art media stimulates primal areas of the brain and meets basic expressive needs—all while providing sensory and kinesthetic feedback for the artist. If an individual is operating at the kinesthetic end of the spectrum, he or she may find satisfaction in movement—i.e. pounding at a piece of clay or scribbling frantically with a crayon. In contrast, if the individual is gravitating towards the sensory end of the spectrum, he or she might take more pleasure in the feel of finger-paints or the smell of scented markers.

This level is particularly useful for young children but may also be useful for anyone needing to focus on sensorimotor skills. In addition, functioning at this level may allow for better access to preverbal memories or expression of extreme emotions. Individuals may identify operation at the K/S as a personal coping mechanism, in which the experience rather than the product is viewed as therapeutic.

Perceptual/Affective Level (P/A)

The second level of the ETC, the Perceptual/Affective level may or may not include verbal thought processes. However, the focus has shifted from the experience alone (with little focus on the outcome, as in the K/S level) to using the media to create an intentionally expressive or self-satisfying final product. The process may be characterized either by an individual's intent to express his or her own literal reality or be characterized by content that is "emotional and raw...without regard to form".

By working with individuals at the P/A level, art therapists can help clients to perceive images or notions in a new way, strengthening communication and assisting with the formation of meaningful relationships. They can also focus on the identification and healthy expression of one's emotions.

Cognitive/Symbolic Level (C/Sy)

Operation at the third level of the ETC, the cognitive/symbolic level, requires "complex and sophisticated" information processing, in which the individual consciously and strategically plans—prior to creating the art piece—for an expressive and self-satisfying final product. At this level, individuals are able to step outside their own sphere of perception and emotional expression and focus on ways that they interact with the world around them. They may begin to use satire and hidden meanings in their pieces to best express their unique response to their surroundings or situation (symbolic) or use art to plan and to problem-solve (cognitive).

Creative Level (Cr)

The final level, which either intersects the previous three levels or transcends above them, is the Creative level. This level symbolizes a wholeness, in which the individual achieves a sense of joy, fulfillment, or wellbeing by taking part in the creative process and expressing the self. This may be accomplished through the integration of the three previous levels (where there was inclusion of all expressive operations in the art-making process; a feeling of oneness) or success in fulfilling an individual's need at any given level, which may be healing in and of itself.

References 

Behavioural sciences